Hauptmann is a German word for captain but may also refer to:
 Hauptmann Deutschland, comic-book character
 Hauptmann (officer), OF2-rank, equivalent to captain in English speaking armed forces
 Der Hauptmann, a 2017 German film
Hauptmann is the surname of:
 Bruno Hauptmann, kidnapper of Charles Lindbergh's baby
 Elisabeth Hauptmann, writer who worked with Bertolt Brecht
 Gerhart Hauptmann (1862–1946), German author
 Mark Hauptmann (born 1984), German politician
 Moritz Hauptmann, musician
 Ralf Hauptmann, footballer
 Hauptmann (crater), a crater on Mercury

See also
 Hauptman
 Der Hauptmann von Köpenick, a series of films

Occupational surnames
German-language surnames